The women's 10 km pursuit biathlon competition of the Sochi 2014 Olympics was held at Laura Biathlon & Ski Complex on 11 February 2014.

In the pursuit competition, the competitors start times were determined according to the results of the Women's sprint held two days earlier, with the sprint champion Anastasiya Kuzmina starting first. None of the sprint medalists won a medal in the pursuit. Instead, Darya Domracheva of Belarus became the champion, with Tora Berger of Norway winning the silver medal, and Teja Gregorin of Slovenian winning the bronze. Gregorin's medal became the first ever medal of Slovenia in biathlon.

Qualification

Countries were assigned quotas using a combination of the Nation Cup scores of their top 3 athletes in the individual, sprint, and relay competitions at the 2012 World Championships in Ruhpolding, Germany, and the 2013 World Championships in Nové Město na Moravě, Czech Republic. The top 20 nations would be able to start four athletes in the sprint, while nations 21 through 28 could start one each. Nations below 28 could only start if any nation decided to vacate a quota spot.

During the 2012–13 or 2013–14 Biathlon World Cup season the athlete must have two results at IBU Cup, Open European Championships, World Championships or World Cup in the Sprint or Individual that at a maximum 20% behind the average time of the top three athletes. Or, two placings in the top half at the Junior World Championships. They also can have a combination of both criteria (one of each).

For the pursuit race the top 60 athletes in the sprint race qualified to compete.

Schedule
All dates and times are (UTC+4).

Results
The race was started at 19:00.

* Includes four-minute penalty

On 27 November 2017, IOC disqualified Olga Vilukhina and Yana Romanova for doping violations.

References 

Pursuit